Club de Fútbol Sant Rafel, known as Sant Rafel or San Rafael, is a Spanish football team based in San Rafael, Ibiza, in the Balearic Islands. Founded in 1968, it plays in Regional Preferente de Ibiza-Formentera, holding home games at Camp Municipal d'Esports Sant Rafel, with a capacity of 2,500.

On 30 May 2019, the club announced an agreement with UD Ibiza to become their farm team. The affiliation ended in 2022, after Ibiza created their own reserve team.

Season to season
As an independent club

14 seasons in Tercera División
1 season in Tercera División RFEF

Notes

References

External links
ArefePedia team profile 
Fútbol Regional team profile 
Soccerway team profile

CF Sant Rafel
UD Ibiza
Sport in Ibiza
Association football clubs established in 1968
1968 establishments in Spain